Local government elections took place in London, and some other parts of the United Kingdom on Thursday 4 May 1978. Ward changes took place in every borough (except Enfield) which increased the total number of councillors by 41 from 1,867 to 1,908.

All London borough council seats were up for election.  The previous Borough elections in London were in 1974.

Results summary

Turnout: 2,213,900 voters cast ballots, a turnout of 42.9% (+6.6%).

Council results

Overall councillor numbers

|}

Borough result maps

References

 
May 1978 events in the United Kingdom
1978